Meath may refer to:

General
County Meath, Republic of Ireland
Kingdom of Meath, medieval precursor of the county
List of kings of Meath
Meath GAA, including the intercounty football and hurling teams
Diocese of Meath, in the Roman Catholic Church, and formerly in the Church of Ireland
Meath Hospital in Dublin, Republic of Ireland
Earl of Meath, a title in the peerage of Ireland
Petronilla de Meath, burned at the stake in Kilkenny, Ireland in 1324 for witchcraft

Constituencies
Meath (Parliament of Ireland constituency), until 1801
Meath (UK Parliament constituency), 1801-1885
North Meath (UK Parliament constituency), 1885-1921
South Meath (UK Parliament constituency), 1885-1921
Louth–Meath (Dáil constituency), 1921-1923
Meath (Dáil constituency), 1923-1937
Meath–Westmeath (Dáil constituency), 1937-1948
Meath (Dáil constituency), 1948-2007
Meath East (Dáil constituency), from 2007
Meath West (Dáil constituency), from 2007

See also
Meath Park, Saskatchewan
Meath Gardens, London